Margaret Livingston Chanler Aldrich (1870–1963) was an American philanthropist, poet, nurse, and woman's suffrage advocate.  She served as a nurse with the American Red Cross during the Spanish–American War and Philippine–American War, travelling to the Philippines, Cuba, and Puerto Rico, where she organized the care and treatment of wounded soldiers, for which she received a gold medal from Congress. She helped pass a 1901 bill establishing the Women's Army Nursing Corps and later served as an advocate for rural nursing, encouraging community members to support nurses.  A daughter of the New York politician John Winthrop Chanler, and wife of the New York Times music critic Richard Aldrich, she was a member of the prominent Astor family, and later in life wrote of the family in her memoirs, Family Vista (1958).  A proponent of women's suffrage, she was a past president of the Protestant Episcopal Woman's Suffrage Association. 

Margaret purchased from her siblings the family estate Rokeby, where she started a dairy farm. As of 2019, the property remains with her descendants.

References

External links

Letter: Mrs. Richard Aldrich to Ida M. Tarbell, June 10, 1930

1870 births
1963 deaths
American suffragists
Astor Orphans
American philanthropists
American women poets
American nurses
American women nurses
Chanler family
Winthrop family